Hung is an American comedy-drama television series that ran on HBO from June 28, 2009, to December 4, 2011. It was created by Colette Burson and Dmitry Lipkin, and stars Thomas Jane as Ray Drecker, a struggling suburban Detroit high-school basketball and baseball coach who resorts to prostitution. The second season premiered on June 27, 2010, and concluded its 10-episode run on September 12, 2010. The third season premiered on October 2, 2011, and concluded its 10-episode run on December 4, 2011. The series was cancelled after three seasons.

Plot
Hung follows Ray Drecker (Jane), a high-school basketball coach in the suburbs of Detroit, who is short on money. He is also the father of twin teenagers (Charlie Saxton and Sianoa Smit-McPhee) who move in with their remarried mother (Anne Heche) after a fire damages the childhood home Ray still owns. With no insurance to cover the damage from the fire, Ray is left without many options. With the help of a friend, Tanya (Jane Adams), Ray decides to use his above-average sized penis as an opportunity to make money. The episodes center on Ray's attempts to maintain a normal life while starting his business as a prostitute. Together, Tanya and Ray start their business, Happiness Consultants.

The second season focuses on the complex dynamic between Ray and his two pimps, Tanya and Lenore (Rebecca Creskoff). Lenore, a life coach whom Tanya brought in to help them in the early stages of the business, began taking over Happiness Consultants late in the first season, as she believes she can take Ray into new business areas and views Tanya as an obstacle.

The third season has Tanya and Ray forced to compete for clients against Lenore and her younger gigolo Jason (Stephen Amell).

Episodes

Cast and characters

Main
 Thomas Jane as Ray Drecker is a former star athlete-turned-high-school-teacher/coach and single dad, who decides to parlay his nine-inch penis into a career as a prostitute to provide a better life for himself and his children. 
 Jane Adams as Tanya Skagle is a former flame of Ray's who reunites with him later on. She takes on the role of his pimp after proving to have the optimism to make money in the business.
 Anne Heche as Jessica Haxon is Ray's ex-wife, who is trying to build a relationship with her children as they drift away from her. She also finds herself drifting from her new husband, Ronnie.
 Charlie Saxton as Damon Drecker is Ray and Jessica's son. He partakes in goth-like activities and is unsure as to his exact sexuality. He has issues with his mom, and he has an unhealthy fixation on his sister, and has a very positive relationship with his father.
 Sianoa Smit-McPhee as Darby Drecker is Ray and Jessica's daughter and Damon's twin. Darby has had issues with her boyfriend and is very close to her brother, often a source of support.
 Eddie Jemison as Ronnie Haxon (seasons 1–2, recurring season 3) is Jessica's new husband, who is starting to become more about business than romance, causing both Jessica and himself to drift to outside romantic sources.
 Rebecca Creskoff as Lenore Bernard (recurring season 1,  seasons 2–3) is a life coach, who is introduced to Ray by Tanya to bring in clients. Eventually, Lenore proves she can be a better pimp than Tanya, and the two are currently battling for his attention. 
 Gregg Henry as Mike Hunt (recurring season 1, seasons 2–3) is Ray's good friend and assistant coach. He is becoming suspicious of Ray's behavior and is worried about being laid off as the school begins cutting costs.
 Lennie James as Charlie (recurring season 2, season 3) is Tanya's pimp mentor.
 Stephen Amell as Jason (season 3) is a young prostitute found by Lenore to serve as competition against Ray.

Recurring

Production
The show's pilot was directed by film-maker Alexander Payne, who served as executive producer along with Burson, Lipkin, and Blueprint Entertainment. Burson and Lipkin's script was the first major purchase by the network's new entertainment president Sue Naegle in April 2008. This led the writers to immediately work on five more episodes for the series, a total of 10 episodes. On December 18, 2008, HBO announced picking up the series for its first season, which ran from June 28, 2009, to September 13, 2009. On July 30, 2009, HBO announced it had renewed the series for its second season, which ran from June 27, 2010. In December 2011, HBO announced the cancellation of the series, ending it after three seasons.

For his role as Ray Decker, Thomas Jane was nominated three times as Best Actor for a Golden Globe.

The theme song for Hung is "I'll Be Your Man" by The Black Keys from their debut album The Big Come Up (2002).

Much of the show was filmed in the suburban Detroit cities of Royal Oak, Hamtramck, White Lake, Troy, Walled Lake, Clarkston, and West Bloomfield, Michigan.

Home media

Reception
Hung was well received by critics. For its first season, the series' reviews equated to generally positive, with special mentions made to Thomas Jane and Jane Adams for their lead performances.  The show received many nominations during its run.

Casting Society of America, USA

 2010: Outstanding Achievement in Casting – Television Pilot (Comedy): Lisa Beach and Sarah Katzman (nominated)

Golden Globe Awards

 2012: Best Actor – Television Series: Musical or Comedy:  Thomas Jane (nominated)
 2011: Best Actor – Television Series: Musical or Comedy:  Thomas Jane (nominated)
 2010: Best Actor – Television Series: Musical or Comedy:  Thomas Jane (nominated)
 2010: Best Supporting Actress – Series, Miniseries, or Television Film:  Jane Adams (nominated)

Primetime Emmy Award

 2010: Outstanding Cinematography for a Half-Hour Series:  Uta Briesewitz (Episode: "Pilot") (nominated)

Satellite Awards

 2010: Best Actor – Television Series: Musical or Comedy:  Thomas Jane (nominated)
 2010: Best Actress – Television Series: Musical or Comedy:  Jane Adams (nominated)

Writers Guild of America Award

 2010: Best Screenplay – New Series: Colette Burson, Ellie Herman, Emily Kapnek, Brett C. Leonard, Dmitry Lipkin, and Angela Robinson (nominated)

Notes

References

External links

 
 

2000s American comedy-drama television series
2000s American sex comedy television series
2010s American comedy-drama television series
2010s American sex comedy television series
2009 American television series debuts
2011 American television series endings
English-language television shows
HBO original programming
Male prostitution in the arts
Prostitution in American television
Television series by Entertainment One
Television shows set in Detroit